Epermenia uedai is a moth of the family Epermeniidae. It is found in Japan (Kyushu).

The basal half of the forewings is whitish-grey tinged with ochreous, scattered with blackish scales on the costal area. The apical half of the wing has a light chocolate-brown patch. The hindwings are pale greyish-fuscous.

Etymology
The species is named in honour of Dr. Tatsuya Ueda, who collected the holotype.

References

External links

Moths described in 2006
Endemic fauna of Japan
Epermeniidae
Moths of Japan